Maranhão State may refer to:
 Maranhão
 Maranhão (former state), 1621–1751

State name disambiguation pages